"Blitzkrieg" is a 1993 single by Excessive Force, a KMFDM side project. This release precedes the album Gentle Death, and was included in the re-release of that album in 2007.

Track listing

Personnel
 Sascha Konietzko – vocals (2), programming
 Liz Torres – vocals (1)
 Mark Durante – guitar
 Günter Schulz (listed as "King Gruntner") – guitars

References

1993 singles
Excessive Force songs
TVT Records singles
Songs written by Sascha Konietzko
Songs written by Günter Schulz
1993 songs
Wax Trax! Records singles